Monument to the Revolution may refer to:

 Monument to the Revolution (Kozara), a 1972 World War II memorial sculpture by Dušan Džamonja
 Monument to the Revolution of the people of Moslavina, a 1967 World War II memorial sculpture by Dušan Džamonja
 Monument to the Revolution of 1905, a monument in Tallinn, Estonia
 Monument to the Revolution of 1905 (Matveev Kurgan), a monument in Taganrog, Russia
 Monumento a la Revolución, a monument in Mexico City